Isognathus caricae is a moth of the  family Sphingidae. It is known from Costa Rica, French Guiana, Bolivia, Argentina and Brazil.

Description 
It is similar to Acherontia species and other Isognathus species, from which it can be distinguished by the dark marginal band of the hindwing upperside, which is replaced by a series of black streaks along the veins.

Biology 
There are probably multiple generations per year.

The larvae have been recorded feeding on Himatanthus obovatus, Allamanda cathartica and Allamanda schottii. They have long tails and are very colourful, suggesting they are unpalatable to birds.

Subspecies
Isognathus caricae caricae (Costa Rica, French Guiana, Bolivia, Argentina and Brazil)
Isognathus caricae rainermarxi Eitschberger, 1999 (Peru)

Gallery

References

Isognathus
Moths described in 1758
Taxa named by Carl Linnaeus